Bruce Albert Huther (born July 23, 1954) is a former American football linebacker in the National Football League for the Dallas Cowboys, Cleveland Browns, and Chicago Bears. He also was a member of the Pittsburgh Maulers and Denver Gold of the United States Football League. He played college football at the University of New Hampshire.

Early years
Huther grew up in Haledon, New Jersey and played high school football at Manchester Regional High School. He moved on to the University of New Hampshire, where he was a three-year starter at linebacker. He also played some fullback.

He led the team in tackles in his last two seasons, while helping the team win two Yankee Conference Championships (1975 and 1976).

Professional career

Dallas Cowboys (first stint)
Huther was signed as an undrafted free agent by the Dallas Cowboys after the 1977 NFL Draft. As a rookie, he played mainly on special teams and was a part of the Super Bowl XII winning team, recovering a fumble during the game.

In his second season, he was named the special teams captain and solidified his status as one of the best players on the unit. He won the team's special teams player of the year award twice. He was also considered one of the strongest players on the team.

On August 24, 1981, to make room for rookie Danny Spradlin, he was traded to the Cleveland Browns in exchange of a sixth round draft choice (#143-Ken Hammond).

Cleveland Browns
In 1981, he appeared in 16 games (2 starts), but after the team signed Tom Cousineau in the offseason, he demanded to be traded and was sent to the Chicago Bears in exchange of a seventh round draft choice (#176-Rocky Belk) on August 13, 1982.

Chicago Bears
In 1982, he was a backup linebacker with the Chicago Bears. On December 2, he was placed on the injured reserve list to make room for the recently signed Al Chesley. He was not re-signed after the season.

Dallas Cowboys (second stint)
On October 1, 1983, Huther signed as a free agent with the Dallas Cowboys to replace Scott McLean, who was out for the season. He started five games at middle linebacker in place of an injured Bob Breunig.

Pittsburgh Maulers (USFL)
In 1984, although his rights belonged to the Chicago Blitz of the United States Football League, the Pittsburgh Maulers traded for him and also convinced him not to re-sign with the Dallas Cowboys. After leading the team in tackles, he was benched the next year in favor of rookie Ernest Adams, which made Huther to eventually force his release.

Denver Gold (USFL)
On May 30, 1984, he signed as a free agent with the Denver Gold, where he played until the league folded.

Personal life
Huther graduated from New Hampshire with a degree in zoology, and later earned a master's degree from the University of Texas at Dallas. In 1992, he founded Huther & Associates, an aquatic toxicology laboratory, in Denton, Texas.

References

1954 births
Living people
People from Haledon, New Jersey
Players of American football from Paterson, New Jersey
American football linebackers
New Hampshire Wildcats football players
Dallas Cowboys players
Cleveland Browns players
Chicago Bears players
Pittsburgh Maulers players
Denver Gold players